Odites ochrodryas is a moth in the family Depressariidae. It was described by Edward Meyrick in 1933. It is found in Madagascar.

The wingspan is about 17 mm. The forewings are ochreous brownish with slight rufous tinge. The extreme costal edge is whitish. The hindwings are grey.

References

Moths described in 1933
Odites
Taxa named by Edward Meyrick